The Sony Ericsson LiveView is a wearable device that connects to an Android phone and can display Twitter feeds, RSS feeds, SMS, control the phone's media player, and is capable of running third-party plugins obtainable from Google's Play Store. It is compatible with most Android-powered devices.

LiveView comes with a belt clip and watch band and features a 128x128 OLED display, and Bluetooth radio.

LiveView was introduced on 28 September 2010 and released by the end of the year.

See also
Smartwatch
Wearable computer
Sony SmartWatch
Pebble watch
Omate TrueSmart

References

External links
Official website
Official announcement
Video showing the device
Reviews: Engadget PCmag slashgear

Android (operating system) devices
Sony Mobile